The Culicomorpha are an infraorder of Nematocera, including mosquitoes, black flies, and several extant and extinct families of insects. They originated 176 million years ago, in the Triassic period. There are phylogenetic patterns that are used to interpret bionomic features such as differences in the nature of blood-feeding by adult females, daytime or nighttime feeding by adult females, and occurrence of immature stages in aquatic habitats.

Most adult, females lay their eggs on bodies of water. Some are restricted to very clean waters, but others can tolerate highly polluted environments.

Many adults transmit parasites or diseases that can be debilitating or fatal to humans, such as malaria and West Nile virus. Biting midges can transmit an extensive range of pathogens of veterinary importance, including Akabane virus, bovine ephemeral fever virus, Schmallenberg virus, African horse sickness virus, epizootic haemorrhagic disease virus, and bluetongue virus.

Classification
Extant families
 Superfamily Culicoidea
 Dixidae -meniscus midges
 Corethrellidae -frog-biting midges
 Chaoboridae -phantom midges
 Culicidae -mosquitoes
 Superfamily Chironomoidea
 Thaumaleidae -solitary midges
 Simuliidae -black flies and buffalo gnats
 Ceratopogonidae -biting midges
 Chironomidae -nonbiting midges

Extinct families
 Asiochaoboridae (Upper Jurassic)
 Architendipedidae (Upper Triassic)
 Protendipedidae (Middle Jurassic)
 Mesophantasmatidae (Middle Jurassic)

References

 
Insect infraorders